Breadsall is a village and civil parish in the English county of Derbyshire, . The population of the civil parish at the 2011 census was 773.  Breadsall Priory is nearby.

History
Breadsall was mentioned in the Domesday Book as belonging to Henry de Ferrers and being worth four pounds. The text includes reference to a knight, a church, meadows and a mill.
The church of All Saints has a very fine war memorial in the style of a Celtic cross within the churchyard, commemorating fourteen men who died during the First World War and nine men and one woman who lost their lives during the Second World War.

Modern day
The village nowadays is relatively peaceful and only gets busy during some rush hour periods when drivers use the village as a thoroughfare to the northern tip of nearby Oakwood, and further afield, to areas including Hilltop, Morley, West Hallam, Heanor and Ilkeston.

The village is a very popular location for retired people who want to live comfortably in their later years, while still in reach of Derby city centre. It is served by a regular bus service, YourBus route 59, which runs between Ilkeston and Derby with departures to Derby between approximately 8am and 5pm, Monday to Saturday only. Bus stops are on Moor Road.

Amenities include a coffe shop ('Damsons') on the main road to the south of the village, a community centre (which during the week is used as a playschool and at other times can be rented out for events such as christenings and birthdays), Breadsall Church of England Primary School, which moved to a brand new building on Brookside Road in February 2023 and a Scout hut, situated just off Brookside Road.

Breadsall also has a large village green and sports field, where cricket and football are played. Breadsall Cricket Club has been on this site since the 1950s and remains a thriving institution within Breadsall and the surrounding locale. The Club currently has 2 senior teams competing in the Derbyshire County Cricket League, a Friendly XI team and a junior training section that play competitive cricket in the Erewash Young Cricketers League.

The population of the village is approximately 630.

Notable residents
Erasmus Darwin (1731–1802) died in Breadsall
Francis Darwin naturalist
Henry Harpur-Crewe was rector here
Joseph Whittaker, botanist, was born here in 1815

See also
Listed buildings in Breadsall

References

External links

Photographs of Breadsall Village- Images include All Saints church, War Memorial, Village Shop, Windmill pub, The old village school, Dam Brook and the remains of Breadsall Railway station.
Fading then and now photo of Breadsall Railway Station - See how this view has changed in 60 years.

Villages in Derbyshire
Civil parishes in Derbyshire
Borough of Erewash